Dyschirius zanzibaricus is a species of ground beetle in the subfamily Scaritinae. It was described by Maximilien Chaudoir in 1878.

References

zimini
Beetles described in 1878